Henri Eli Kruyt (27 June 1907 – 22 November 1988) was a Dutch rower. He competed at the 1928 Summer Olympics in Amsterdam with the men's eight where they were eliminated in round two.

References

1907 births
1988 deaths
Dutch male rowers
Olympic rowers of the Netherlands
Rowers at the 1928 Summer Olympics
People from Banda Aceh
European Rowing Championships medalists
20th-century Dutch people